In welfare economics, a social welfare function is a function that ranks social states (alternative complete descriptions of the society) as less desirable, more desirable, or indifferent for every possible pair of social states.  Inputs of the function include any variables considered to affect the economic welfare of a society.  In using welfare measures of persons in the society as inputs, the social welfare function is individualistic in form.  One use of a social welfare function is to represent prospective patterns of collective choice as to alternative social states. The social welfare function provides the government with a simple guideline for achieving the optimal distribution of income.

The social welfare function is analogous to the consumer theory of indifference-curve–budget constraint tangency for an individual, except that the social welfare function is a mapping of individual preferences or judgments of everyone in the society as to collective choices, which apply to all, whatever individual preferences are for (variable) constraints on factors of production.  One point of a social welfare function is to determine how close the analogy is to an ordinal utility function for an individual with at least minimal restrictions suggested by welfare economics, including constraints on the number of factors of production.
  
There are two major distinct but related types of social welfare functions:
 A Bergson–Samuelson social welfare function considers welfare for a given set of individual preferences or welfare rankings. 
 An Arrow social welfare function considers welfare across different possible sets of individual preferences or welfare rankings and seemingly reasonable axioms that constrain the function.

Bergson–Samuelson social welfare function
In a 1938 article, Abram Bergson introduced the social welfare function.  The object was "to state in precise form the value judgments required for the derivation of the conditions of maximum economic welfare" set out by earlier writers, including Marshall and Pigou, Pareto and Barone, and Lerner.  The function was real-valued and differentiable.  It was specified to describe the society as a whole. Arguments of the function included the quantities of different commodities produced and consumed and of resources used in producing different commodities, including labor.

Necessary general conditions are that at the maximum value of the function:
 The marginal "dollar's worth" of welfare is equal for each individual and for each commodity
 The marginal "diswelfare" of each "dollar's worth" of labor is equal for each commodity produced of each labor supplier
 The marginal "dollar" cost of each unit of resources is equal to the marginal value productivity for each commodity.
Bergson showed how welfare economics could describe a standard of economic efficiency despite dispensing with interpersonally-comparable cardinal utility, the hypothesization of which may merely conceal value judgments, and purely subjective ones at that.

Auxiliary specifications enable comparison of different social states by each member of society in preference satisfaction.  These help define Pareto efficiency, which holds if all alternatives have been exhausted to put at least one person in a more preferred position with no one put in a less preferred position.  Bergson described an "economic welfare increase" (later called a Pareto improvement) as at least one individual moving to a more preferred position with everyone else indifferent.  The social welfare function could then be specified in a substantively individualistic sense to derive Pareto efficiency (optimality).  Paul Samuelson (2004, p. 26) notes that Bergson's function "could derive Pareto optimality conditions as necessary but not sufficient for defining interpersonal normative equity."  Still, Pareto efficiency could also characterize one dimension of a particular social welfare function with distribution of commodities among individuals characterizing another dimension.  As Bergson noted, a welfare improvement from the social welfare function could come from the "position of some individuals" improving at the expense of others.  That social welfare function could then be described as characterizing an equity dimension.

Samuelson (1947, p. 221) himself stressed the flexibility of the social welfare function to characterize any one ethical belief, Pareto-bound or not, consistent with:
 a complete and transitive ranking (an ethically "better", "worse", or "indifferent" ranking) of all social alternatives and
 one set out of an infinity of welfare indices and cardinal indicators to characterize the belief.
He also presented a lucid verbal and mathematical exposition of the social welfare function (1947, pp. 219–49) with minimal use of Lagrangean multipliers and without the difficult notation of differentials used by Bergson throughout.  As Samuelson (1983, p. xxii) notes, Bergson clarified how production and consumption efficiency conditions are distinct from the interpersonal ethical values of the social welfare function.

Samuelson further sharpened that distinction by specifying the Welfare function and the Possibility function (1947, pp. 243–49).  Each has as arguments the set of utility functions for everyone in the society.  Each can (and commonly does) incorporate Pareto efficiency.  The Possibility function also depends on technology and resource restraints.  It is written in implicit form, reflecting the feasible locus of utility combinations imposed by the restraints and allowed by Pareto efficiency.  At a given point on the Possibility function, if the utility of all but one person is determined, the remaining person's utility is determined.  The Welfare function ranks different hypothetical sets of utility for everyone in the society from ethically lowest on up (with ties permitted), that is, it makes interpersonal comparisons of utility.  Welfare maximization then consists of maximizing the Welfare function subject to the Possibility function as a constraint.  The same welfare maximization conditions emerge as in Bergson's analysis.

Arrow social welfare function (constitution)
Kenneth Arrow (1963) generalizes the analysis.  Along earlier lines, his version of a social welfare function, also called a 'constitution', maps a set of individual orderings (ordinal utility functions) for everyone in the society to a social ordering, a rule for ranking alternative social states (say passing an enforceable law or not, ceteris paribus).  Arrow finds that nothing of behavioral significance is lost by dropping the requirement of social orderings that are real-valued (and thus cardinal) in favor of orderings, which are merely complete and transitive, such as a standard indifference curve map. The earlier analysis mapped any set of individual orderings to one social ordering, whatever it was.  This social ordering selected the top-ranked feasible alternative from the economic environment as to resource constraints. Arrow proposed to examine mapping different sets of individual orderings to possibly different social orderings.  Here the social ordering would depend on the set of individual orderings, rather than being imposed (invariant to them).  Stunningly (relative to a course of theory from Adam Smith and Jeremy Bentham on), Arrow proved the general impossibility theorem which says that it is impossible to have a social welfare function that satisfies a certain set of "apparently reasonable" conditions.

Cardinal social welfare functions
A cardinal social welfare function is a function that takes as input numeric representations of individual utilities (also known as cardinal utility), and returns as output a numeric representation of the collective welfare. The underlying assumption is that individuals utilities can be put on a common scale and compared. Examples of such measures can be:
 life expectancy,
 per capita income.
For the purposes of this section, income is adopted as the measurement of utility.

The form of the social welfare function is intended to express a statement of objectives of a society.

The utilitarian or Benthamite social welfare function measures social welfare as the total or sum of individual incomes:

In this case, maximizing the social welfare means maximizing the total income of the people in the society, without regard to how incomes are distributed in society. It does not distinguish between an income transfer from rich to poor and vice versa. If an income transfer from the poor to the rich results in a bigger increase in the utility of the rich than the decrease in the utility of the poor, the society is expected to accept such a transfer, because the total utility of the society has increased as a whole. Alternatively, society's welfare can also be measured under this function by taking the average of individual incomes:

In contrast, the max-min or Rawlsian social welfare function (based on the philosophical work of John Rawls) measures the social welfare of society on the basis of the welfare of the least well-off individual member of society:

Here maximizing societal welfare would mean maximizing the income of the poorest person in society without regard for the income of other individuals.

These two social welfare functions express very different views about how a society would need to be organised in order to maximize welfare, with the first emphasizing total incomes and the second emphasizing the needs of the worst-off.  The max-min welfare function can be seen as reflecting an extreme form of uncertainty aversion on the part of society as a whole, since it is concerned only with the worst conditions that a member of society could face.

Amartya Sen proposed a welfare function in 1973:

 
The average per capita income of a measured group (e.g. nation) is multiplied with  where  is the Gini index, a relative inequality measure. James E. Foster (1996) proposed to use one of Atkinson's Indexes, which is an entropy measure. Due to the relation between Atkinsons entropy measure and the Theil index, Foster's welfare function also can be computed directly using the Theil-L Index.

The value yielded by this function has a concrete meaning. There are several possible incomes which could be earned by a person, who randomly is selected from a population with an unequal distribution of incomes. This welfare function marks the income, which a randomly selected person is most likely to have. Similar to the median, this income will be smaller than the average per capita income.

Here the Theil-T index is applied. The inverse value yielded by this function has a concrete meaning as well. There are several possible incomes to which a Euro may belong, which is randomly picked from the sum of all unequally distributed incomes. This welfare function marks the income, which a randomly selected Euro most likely belongs to. The inverse value of that function will be larger than the average per capita income.

The article on the Theil index provides further information about how this index is used in order to compute welfare functions.

Axioms of cardinal welfarism 
Suppose we are given a preference relation R on utility profiles. R is a weak total order on utility profiles—it can tell us, given any two utility profiles, if they are indifferent or one of them is better than the other. A reasonable preference ordering should satisfy several axioms:

1. Monotonicity, i.e., if the utility of an individual increases while all other utilities remain equal, R should strictly prefer the second profile. E.g., it should prefer the profile (1,4,4,5) to (1,2,4,5). This is related to Pareto optimality.

2. Symmetry, i.e., R should be indifferent to permutation of the numbers in the utility profile. E.g., it should be indifferent between (1,4,4,5) and (5,4,1,4).

3. Continuity: for every profile v, the set of profiles weakly better than v and the set of profiles weakly worse than v are closed sets.

4. Independence of unconcerned agents, i.e., R should be independent of individuals whose utilities have not changed. E.g., if R prefers (2,2,4) to (1,3,4), then it also prefers (2,2,9) to (1,3,9); the utility of agent 3 should not affect the comparison between two utility profiles of agents 1 and 2. This property can also be called locality or separability. It allows us to treat allocation problems in a local way, and separate them from the allocation in the rest of society.

Every preference relation with properties 1–4 can be represented as by a function W which is a sum of the form:

where w is a continuous increasing function.

It is also reasonable to require:

5. Independence of common scale, i.e., the relation between two utility profiles does not change if both of them are multiplied by the same scalar (e.g., the relation does not depend on whether we measure the income in cents, dollars or thousands).

If the preference relation has properties 1–5, then the function w belongs to the following one-parameter family:
This family has some familiar members:
 The limit when  is the leximin ordering;
 For  we get the Nash bargaining solution—maximizing the product of utilities;
 For  we get the utilitarian welfare function—maximizing the sum of utilities;
 The limit when  is the leximax ordering.

If, in addition, we require:

6. the Pigou–Dalton principle,

then the parameter p, in the above family, must be at most 1.

See also 

 Aggregation problem
 Arrow's impossibility theorem
 Community indifference curve
 Distribution (economics)
 Economic welfare
 Extended sympathy
 Gorman polar form
 Justice (economics)
 Liberal paradox
 Production-possibility frontier
 Social choice theory
 Welfare economics

Notes

References 
Kenneth J. Arrow, 1951, 2nd ed., 1963, Social Choice and Individual Values  
 Abram Bergson (Burk),"A Reformulation of Certain Aspects of Welfare Economics," Quarterly Journal of Economics, 52(2), February 1938, 310–34
 Bergson–Samuelson social welfare functions in Paretian welfare economics from the New School.
 James E. Foster and Amartya Sen, 1996, On Economic Inequality, expanded edition with annexe, .
 John C. Harsanyi, 1987, “interpersonal utility comparisons," The New Palgrave: A Dictionary of Economics, v. 2, 955–58
 
Also available as: a journal article.
 Jan de Van Graaff, 1957, "Theoretical Welfare Economics", 1957, Cambridge, UK: Cambridge University Press.
 Lionel Robbins, 1935, 2nd ed.. An Essay on the Nature and Significance of Economic Science, ch. VI
 , 1938, "Interpersonal Comparisons of Utility: A Comment,"  Economic Journal, 43(4), 635–41
 Paul A. Samuelson, 1947, Enlarged ed. 1983, Foundations of Economic Analysis, pp. xxi–xxiv & ch. VIII, "Welfare Economics," 
 _, 1977. "Reaffirming the Existence of 'Reasonable' Bergson–Samuelson Social Welfare Functions," Economica, N.S., 44(173), p pp. 81–88.  Reprinted in (1986) The Collected Scientific Papers of Paul A. Samuelson, pp. 47–54. 
 _, 1981. "Bergsonian Welfare Economics", in S. Rosefielde (ed.), Economic Welfare and the Economics of Soviet Socialism: Essays in Honor of Abram Bergson, Cambridge University Press, Cambridge, pp. 223–66. Reprinted in (1986) The Collected Scientific Papers of Paul A. Samuelson, pp. 3 –46.
 Sen, Amartya K. (1963). "Distribution, Transitivity and Little's Welfare Criteria," Economic Journal, 73(292), pp. 771–78.
 _, 1970 [1984], Collective Choice and Social Welfare (description), ch. 3, "Collective Rationality." 
 _ (1982).  Choice, Welfare and Measurement, MIT Press. Description and scroll to chapter-preview links.
 Kotaro Suzumura (1980). "On Distributional Value Judgments and Piecemeal Welfare Criteria," Economica, 47(186), p pp. 125–39.
 _, 1987, “social welfare function," The New Palgrave: A Dictionary of Economics, v. 4, 418–20

Welfare economics
Social choice theory
Mathematical economics